The Suzon is a French river in the Côte-d'Or department, in the Bourgogne-Franche-Comté region and a tributary of the Ouche, therefore a sub-tributary of the Rhône, by the Saône.
The river enters the Ouche at Dijon.

References 

Rivers of Côte-d'Or
Saône basin